Heckler is a surname. Notable people with the surname include:

David Heckler (born 1947), American politician
Edmund Heckler (1906–1960), German weapons manufacturer and businessman
Margaret Heckler (1931-2018), American politician
Mark A. Heckler, American academic administrator